Sennacherib's campaign in the Levant in 701 BCE was a military campaign undertaken by the Neo-Assyrian Empire to bring the region back under control following a rebellion against Assyrian rule in 705 BCE. After the death of Sargon II, Sennacherib’s father, a number of states in the Levant renounced their allegiance to Assyria. The rebellion involved several small states: Sidon and Ashkelon (which were taken by force) and Byblos, Ashdod, Ammon, Moab, and Edom who then submitted to the payment of tribute to Assyria. Most notably, Hezekiah of Judah, encouraged by Egypt, joined the rebellion and was subsequently invaded by the Assyrians who captured most of the cities and towns in the region. Hezekiah was trapped in Jerusalem by an Assyrian army and the surrounding lands were given to Assyrian vassals in Ekron, Gaza, and Ashdod, however, the city was not taken and Hezekiah was allowed to remain on his throne as an Assyrian vassal after paying a large tribute. The events of the campaign in Judah are famously related in the Bible (2 Kgs18–19; Isa 36–37; and 2Chr 32) which culminate in an “angel of the Lord” striking down 185,000 Assyrians outside the gates of Jerusalem prompting Sennacherib’s return to Nineveh.

Smaller states

Phoenicia, Philistia and Transjordan
Many smaller states in the region joined the rebellion against Assyria. Sidon and Ashkelon were taken by force, after which Byblos, Ashdod, Ammon, Moab, and Edom resubmitted to Assyrian rule without a fight. Ekron attempted to resist with help from Egypt but the Egyptians were defeated and Ekron was reinstated as an Assyrian vassal kingdom.

Campaign in Judah

Siege of Azekah 

Following their success in quelling the smaller rebellious states the Assyrian army turned on Judah and its king, Hezekiah. The timeline of the campaign is somewhat unclear but it is thought that one of the first major engagements between Judah and Assyria was the Siege of Azekah, a walled settlement on a 372 meter high hill roughly 45 kilometers west of Jerusalem. Our knowledge of the siege comes primarily from the Azekah Inscription, a tablet inscription from Sennacherib’s reign which was found in the Library of Ashurbanipal. The inscription describes the use of earthen ramps and battering rams to overcome the cities formidable outer defences followed by the use of foot soldiers and cavalry to take the city. The tablet seems to imply that the defenders of Azekah were routed by the Assyrian cavalry but the inscription is not complete and only the beginning of this section has survived. Following the cities capture the inscription tells us that the Assyrians looted and burned or otherwise destroyed Azekah.

Siege of Lachish 

While the timeline remains unclear it seems that the next major battle between Assyria and Judah occurred at the city of Tel Lachish, a walled city on a hilltop roughly 53 Km south west of Jerusalem. The siege is documented in the Hebrew Bible as well as Assyrian documents but is most prominently depicted in the Lachish reliefs which were once displayed in Sennacherib’s palace at Nineveh.

The hill on which Lachish is located is steeper on the northern side so it is thought that the Assyrians likely attacked the city from the southern slope. The Lachish reliefs depict the city's defenders shooting arrows and throwing stones down onto the Assyrian army who are shown responding with projectiles of their own. During the ongoing skirmishes the Assyrians constructed a siege ramp, evidence of which can still be seen today, to the east of the city's main gate and brought up siege engines which broke the city’s defensive walls. The siege ramp at Lachish is the oldest in the world and the only known example from the Near East. It has been excavated extensively from the 1930’s to as recently as 2017. The biblical accounts tells us that during the siege Sennacherib sent a message to Jerusalem encouraging the city's inhabitants to surrender and telling them that Hezekiah was mistaken in thinking that God would deliver the city from the Assyrian threat.

"Later, when Sennacherib king of Assyria and all his forces were laying siege to Lachish, he sent his officers to Jerusalem with this message for Hezekiah king of Judah and for all the people of Judah who were there. “This is what Sennacherib king of Assyria says: On what are you basing your confidence, that you remain in Jerusalem under siege? When Hezekiah says, ‘The Lord our God will save us from the hand of the king of Assyria,’ he is misleading you, to let you die of hunger and thirst. Did not Hezekiah himself remove this god’s high places and altars, saying to Judah and Jerusalem, ‘You must worship before one altar and burn sacrifices on it’?     - 2 Chronicles 32:9-12

This message from Sennacherib makes reference to an earlier tribute paid by Hezekiah in hopes of placating the Assyrians which was gathered from the temples of Jerusalem. This account also indicates that Jerusalem was already under siege during the events at Lachish, supporting theories that Sennacherib split his army and campaigned through the territory surrounding Jerusalem while maintaining fortifications outside of the city and encouraging the defenders to surrender as he continued to capture other cities in Judah. The fact that this siege seems to have been passive rather than an active attempt to capture the city has led some scholars to argue that Sennacherib never intended to capture Jerusalem by force and instead blockaded the city, cutting off vital supply lines from surrounding settlements and buying the Assyrians more time to capture cities and weaken Hezekiah’s position. The fact that Sennacherib tells the citizens of Jerusalem that Hezekiah will lead them to die of “Hunger and Thirst” rather than at the hands of Assyrian soldiers may be seen as further evidence that Sennacherib intended to starve out the defenders rather than launch an active siege of the city. This interpretation has been used to support the argument that Sennacherib’s goal was not to completely conquer Judah but simply to reduce its independence and reinstate it as a vassal kingdom, thus reestablishing the status-quo during the reign of his father, Sargon II.

Events at Jerusalem 

As suggested by II Chronicles 32:9-12 and the Assyrian royal inscription, Jerusalem was already under siege or blockade while Sennacherib and a portion of his army were laying siege to Lachish. Furthermore, both the Biblical and Assyrian accounts make mention of an earlier tribute paid to Sennacherib by Hezekiah, opening the possibility that negotiations between the two sides may have been underway for some time before the conclusion of the conflict and the culmination of events at Jerusalem. The Assyrian source describes what happened at Jerusalem as follows:

 
“As for him (Hezekiah), I confined him inside the city Jerusalem, his royal city, like a bird in a cage. I set up blockades against him and made him dread exiting his city gate. I detached from his land the cities of his that I had plundered and I gave (them) to Mitinti, the king of the city Ashdod, and Padî, the king of the city Ekron, (and) Ṣilli-Bēl, the king of the land Gaza, (and thereby) made his land smaller. To the former tribute, their annual giving, I added the payment (of) gifts (in recognition) of my overlordship and imposed (it) upon them.”

This description notably does not describe an active siege, nor are siege engines and ramps mentioned as in the descriptions of the previous sieges. Sennacherib describes dividing the conquered parts of Judah among neighboring vassal kings in Ashdod, Ekron, and Gaza which may illustrate that Sennacherib knew he was capable of conquering Judah without engaging in a long and costly siege of Jerusalem. Furthermore, archaeological evidence suggests that Jerusalem was well fortified and defended, a fact which could have dissuaded the Assyrian army from engaging in a direct assault of the city. With the bulk of Judah's territory under his control or that of his vassals there may have been little reason to actively attack Jerusalem rather than starve the city into submission.

Due to the language used in the above quotation scholars have cited the quote in arguing that there was never a true siege of Jerusalem. These scholars argue that the city was encircled by Assyrian military camps to cut off from supply lines which might have allowed the city to hold out against Sennacherib's army in the event of a direct siege. Some of this argument centers around uncertainty about the meaning of the word “Halsu” in the Assyrian text, which has been interpreted as meaning either siege walls or blockade. Proponents of the blockade theory have cited the lack of description and evidence for a siege in the Assyrian royal inscriptions as evidence that no direct attack on the city occurred or was intended. Though the biblical account alludes to a siege no fighting or assaults on the city are described. Sennacherib’s threat sent from Lachish does not seem to threaten direct violence but rather says that the citizens of Jerusalem will die of hunger and thirst if they remain in the city and loyal to Hezekiah ( 2 Chronicles 32:9-12). This could be seen as further evidence against the idea that there was a true siege at Jerusalem in 701 BCE. 

Following the above quote, the royal inscription moves on to the end of the conflict:

“As for him, Hezekiah, fear of my lordly brilliance overwhelmed him and, after my (departure), he had the auxiliary forces (and) his elite troops whom he had brought inside to strengthen the city Jerusalem, his royal city, thereby gaining reinforcements, (along with) 30 talents of gold, 800 talents of silver, choice antimony, large blocks of ..., ivory beds, armchairs of ivory, elephant hide(s), elephant ivory, ebony, boxwood, garments with multi-colored trim, linen garments, blue-purple wool, red-purple wool, utensils of bronze, iron, copper, tin, (and) iron, chariots, shields, lances, armor, iron belt-daggers, bows and uṣṣu-arrows, equipment, (and) implements of war, (all of) which were without number, together with his daughters, his palace women, male singers, (and) female singers brought into Nineveh, my capital city, and he sent a mounted messenger of his to me to deliver (this) payment and to do obeisance.” 

 
It is at this point that the Assyrian source begins to conflict with the version of events laid out in the Bible. Here Sennacherib tells us that the war ended when Hezekiah was overwhelmed by fear of his “Lordly brilliance” and submitted to paying a large tribute of soldiers, hostages, gold and silver, weapons, and other valuables to be delivered to Nineveh. This could suggest that Hezekiah was overwhelmed by Assyrian strength at arms and, with most of his territory divided between Assyrian vassals, saw submission to Sennacherib’s terms as his only viable option for remaining on the throne of Judah.

The Biblical account gives an entirely different series of events when describing the end of the war. Upon hearing the message sent by Sennacherib from Lachish, we are told that Hezekiah tore his clothes, donned Sackcloth, and commanded his palace administrator and leading priests to do the same before sending them to consult the prophet Isaiah. Isaiah then told them:

“Tell your master, `This is what the LORD says: Do not be afraid of what you have heard--those words with which the underlings of the king of Assyria have blasphemed me.Listen! I am going to put such a spirit in him that when he hears a certain report, he will return to his own country, and there I will have him cut down with the sword.'" (2 Kings 19:1-7). 

Following this, Sennacherib received a report informing him that the king of Egypt was marching with an army to do battle with the Assyrians and sent a response to the words of Isaiah:

"Say to Hezekiah king of Judah: Do not let the god you depend on deceive you when he says, `Jerusalem will not be handed over to the king of Assyria. Surely you have heard what the kings of Assyria have done to all the countries, destroying them completely. And will you be delivered? Did the gods of the nations that were destroyed by my forefathers deliver them: the gods of Gozan, Haran, Rezeph and the people of Eden who were in Tel Assar? Where is the king of Hamath, the king of Arpad, the king of the city of Sepharvaim, or of Hena or Ivvah?" (2 Kings 19:8-13).

Upon receiving this message Hezekiah went to the temple and made another prayer for deliverance from the Assyrian threat. The biblical account then tells us that Isaiah sent a message from God to Hezekiah with words for Sennacherib.

"This is what the LORD, the God of Israel, says: I have heard your prayer concerning Sennacherib king of Assyria. This is the word that the LORD has spoken against him: "`The Virgin Daughter of Zion despises you and mocks you. The Daughter of Jerusalem tosses her head as you flee. Who is it you have insulted and blasphemed? Against whom have you raised your voice and lifted your eyes in pride? Against the Holy One of Israel! By your messengers you have heaped insults on the Lord. And you have said, "With my many chariots I have ascended the heights of the mountains, the utmost heights of Lebanon. I have cut down its tallest cedars, the choicest of its pines. I have reached its remotest parts, the finest of its forests. I have dug wells in foreign lands and drunk the water there. With the soles of my feet I have dried up all the streams of Egypt." `Have you not heard? Long ago I ordained it. In days of old I planned it; now I have brought it to pass, that you have turned fortified cities into piles of stone.

Their people, drained of power, are dismayed and put to shame. They are like plants in the field, like tender green shoots, like grass sprouting on the roof, scorched before it grows up. `But I know where you stay and when you come and go and how you rage against me. Because you rage against me and your insolence has reached my ears, I will put my hook in your nose and my bit in your mouth, and I will make you return by the way you came.' This will be the sign for you, O Hezekiah: "This year you will eat what grows by itself, and the second year what springs from that. But in the third year sow and reap, plant vineyards and eat their fruit. Once more a remnant of the house of Judah will take root below and bear fruit above. For out of Jerusalem will come a remnant, and out of Mount Zion a band of survivors. The zeal of the LORD Almighty will accomplish this. Therefore this is what the LORD says concerning the king of Assyria: "He will not enter this city or shoot an arrow here. He will not come before it with shield or build a siege ramp against it. By the way that he came he will return; he will not enter this city, declares the LORD. I will defend this city and save it, for my sake and for the sake of David my servant." (2 Kings 19:14-35).
After this prophecy is given, the account cuts abruptly to the end of the conflict but gives an entirely different explanation for its conclusion.
"That night the angel of the LORD went out and put to death a hundred and eighty-five thousand men in the Assyrian camp. When the people got up the next morning--there were all the dead bodies! So Sennacherib king of Assyria broke camp and withdrew. He returned to Nineveh and stayed there.

One day, while he was worshiping in the temple of his god Nisroch, his sons Adrammelech and Sharezer cut him down with the sword, and they escaped to the land of Ararat. And Esarhaddon his son succeeded him as king.” (2 Kings 19:35-37)

In this account, Sennacherib's decision not to directly attack or enter the city is explained by the eradication of his army by an angel, causing him to quickly flee to Nineveh. Notably, this account makes no mention of the tribute described in the Assyrian royal inscription nor of the 20 years which elapsed between the events of 701 BCE and Sennacherib’s murder at the hands of his sons in 681 BCE. Furthermore, nothing is said of Judah's status as an Assyrian vassal kingdom after the war. Some have cited the continuation of Judah’s vassal status as evidence that Sennacherib was not fully successful in his war because Judah was not annexed and Hezekiah remained on the throne. Others, however, have argued that this is evidence that Sennacherib succeeded in his goals and that, because Judah was largely divided between other vassal states and had lost nearly all means of production, the kingdom had little to offer Assyria economically and thus was allowed to remain in the empire as a weakened vassal kingdom rather than being annexed and becoming an Assyrian Provence.

This account, and that of Sennacherib’s sudden departure in the royal inscriptions, have prompted some scholars to believe that some sort of calamity did befall the Assyrian army at Jerusalem. Most prominent is the theory that some kind of plague or sickness swept through the Assyrian army camps outside of Jerusalem. Supporters of this theory contend that the outbreak of sickness or plague caused Sennacherib to swiftly conclude his negotiations with Hezekiah, return to Nineveh, and accept his tribute in the Assyrian capital rather than enter the city to take tribute and observe new oaths of loyalty in Jerusalem. Other scholars have pointed to previous conflicts in which the Assyrians allowed rebellious vassals to remain on their thrones after the conclusion of military campaigns against them to bolster claims that there was nothing particularly unusual about the conclusion of Sennacherib’s war with Judah and that following negotiations Sennacherib left with his army intact. Still others speculate that either an unsuccessful siege of the city, or the exhaustion of his army following their previous battles prompted Sennacherib’s retreat and his leniency towards Hezekiah.

References

Cited bibliography 

Garfinkel, Yosef, et al. “Constructing the Assyrian Siege Ramp at Lachish: Texts, Iconography, Archaeology and Photogrammetry.” Oxford Journal of Archaeology, vol. 40, no. 4, 2021, pp. 417–439., https://doi.org/10.1111/ojoa.12231. 
Matty, Nazek Khalid. Sennacherib's Campaign against Judah and Jerusalem in 701 B.C: A Historical Reconstruction. De Gruyter, 2016.
Van der Brugge, Caroline. “Of Production, Trade, Profit and Destruction: An Economic Interpretation of Sennacherib’s Third Campaign.” Journal of the Economic and Social History of the Orient, vol. 60, no. 3, 2017, pp. 292–335., https://doi.org/10.1163/15685209-12341427. 

8th-century BC conflicts
Battles involving Assyria
8th-century BC in Assyria
8th century BC in the Kingdom of Judah
Hebrew Bible battles
Hezekiah
Sennacherib